FKM may refer to :

FKM, a family of fluoroelastomers as defined in ASTM D1418
Maluku Sovereignty Front (FKM, Indonesian: Front Kedaulatan Maluku), an Indonesian rebel group
Fakiragram railway station, and Indian Railways station
FKM Nové Zámky, a Slovak football team
FKM (guideline), a guideline to assess the resistance of mechanical components, commonly named after Forschungskuratorium Maschinenbau, the research association that developed it.